Caño de Sancti Petri is a shallow channel in the province of Cádiz, Andalusia, southwestern Spain. Narrow and winding, it is situated between Isla de León and the mainland, and is part of the Bahía de Cádiz Natural Park.

References

Straits of Spain
Chiclana de la Frontera
Geography of the Province of Cádiz